This is a list of the best-selling singles in 1998 in Japan, as reported by Oricon.

References

1998 in Japanese music
1998
Oricon
Japanese music-related lists